Papá corazón se quiere casar is a 1974 Argentine film directed by Enrique Cahen Salaberry and written by Abel Santa Cruz.

The film is an adaptation of the TV series Papá corazón broadcast in Argentina in 1973 and retains the same cast. It received mixed reviews.

Cast
 Norberto Suárez as Maximiliano de María
 Andrea Del Boca as Angélica "Pinina" de María
 Laura Bove as Camila
 Elcira Olivera Garcés as Tía Peluca
 Liliana Benard as Sister Renata
 Nelly Prono as Mother Superior
 Elizabeth Killian as Cristina
 Diana Ingro as Cristina's mother
 Julián Bourgués
 Augusto Codecá
 Jorge de la Riestra
 Tristán Díaz Ocampo

References

External links
 

1974 films
Argentine comedy-drama films
1970s Spanish-language films
Films directed by Enrique Cahen Salaberry